The men's 200m Freestyle event at the 2006 Central American and Caribbean Games occurred on Wednesday, July 19, 2006, at the S.U. Pedro de Heredia Aquatic Complex in Cartagena, Colombia.

Records

Results

Final

Preliminaries

References

Men's 200 Free--Prelim results from the official website of the 2006 Central American and Caribbean Games; retrieved 2009-06-29.
Men's 200 Free--Final results from the official website of the 2006 Central American and Caribbean Games; retrieved 2009-06-29.

Freestyle, Men's 200m